Rickenbach-Attikon is a railway station in the Swiss canton of Zurich and municipality of Rickenbach. It takes its name from that municipality, and the adjacent village of Attikon, in the municipality of Wiesendangen. The station is located on the Winterthur–Romanshorn railway line. It is an intermediate stop on Zurich S-Bahn services S24 and S30.

References 

Rickenbach-Attikon
Rickenbach-Attikon